Hassan El-Sayed Attia (born 10 November 1931) is an Egyptian former sports shooter. He competed in the 50 metre pistol event at the 1964 Summer Olympics.

References

External links
 

1931 births
Living people
Egyptian male sport shooters
Olympic shooters of Egypt
Shooters at the 1964 Summer Olympics
Place of birth missing (living people)